This is an overview of the regular, recurring, and other characters of the TV series S.W.A.T.

Main characters

Overview

Daniel "Hondo" Harrelson Jr.

Sergeant II Daniel "Hondo" Harrelson Jr is a native of South Los Angeles, Daniel Harrelson was born to Daniel Harrelson, Sr. and Charice Harrelson; he also has a sister, Winnie.  When he was a kid, his father left the family after falling in love with another woman and moved to Oakland, California, where he eventually had another daughter, Briana.  Hondo and his dad remained in touch, going up to live with him during the summers of his teenage years.

As a kid, Hondo and two of his best friends Leroy (Michael Beach) and Darryl ran with a gang, but after Darryl's death, Hondo went to high school (graduating from Crenshaw High School) and eventually joined the force.

After high school, Hondo enlisted in the United States Marine Corps; he served four years (1994 to 1998) with the 1st Battalion, 9th Marines out of Marine Corps Base Camp Pendleton and deployed to Somalia.  After his enlistment ended, Hondo selected not to re-up and instead joined the Los Angeles Police Department.

Hondo began his LAPD career as a patrol officer with the 77th Street Area.  He served as a patrolman for six years before becoming a member of SWAT.  By 2016, he was serving as a Senior Lead Officer on Sergeant Buck Spivey's (Louis Ferreira) SWAT Team. He knows everyone in the neighborhood and treats them all with respect, and they usually give him information pertinent to his cases when he asks for it in return.

In 2017, Hondo was unexpectedly promoted to Team Leader after Buck was fired for accidentally shooting an unarmed black teenager during a shootout over senior team member Sergeant Deacon Kay (Jay Harrington) in a blatant attempt to ease the tensions between the community and the LAPD.

Four months prior to the series, Hondo began a surreptitious romantic relationship with Captain Jessica Cortez (Stephanie Sigman), which, while frowned upon, was not expressly forbidden by LAPD policy; however, after his promotion to Team Leader (which put him directly under her command), the two struggled to keep their relationship secret.  Hondo ultimately broke up with her after they were caught by Commissioner Michael Plank (Peter Facinelli) in order to protect her career.  He later started a relationship with Nia Wells (Nikiva Dionne), a Los Angeles County Deputy District Attorney and recent divorcée.  The relationship ended due to his anger after an encounter with a racist Arizona Department of Public Safety officer and the inability to prosecute the man who drugged and attempted to rape his sister.

In "Invisible", after failing to secure a good foster family for Darryl Henderson, the teenage son of his friend Leroy, Hondo decided to apply to become Darryl's official foster father.

Overtime, Hondo started becoming disillusioned with the LAPD after they failed to terminate a group of racist police officers despite Deacon handing a recording proving their guilt. Disgusted with the LAPD’s lack of action, Hondo went to the LA Times and revealed everything at great risk to his career. Although the racist officers were finally terminated, Hondo was demoted as team leader for going to the press. However, he was reinstated as leader again in season five's "Crisis Actor", after Sanchez departed as leader of 20-Squad.

As a SWAT officer, Hondo drives a 2015 Dodge Charger Pursuit and carries a Kimber Custom TLE II in .45 ACP as his duty weapon.

His Call sign is 20-David.

Jessica Cortez

Captain Jessica Cortez is the Commanding Officer of the LAPD Metropolitan Division.  She is a respected officer who has plans to improve the relationship between the LAPD and the citizens of Los Angeles, despite some resistance from the rank and file.  She is portrayed by Stephanie Sigman.

The daughter of immigrants, Jessica became a naturalized American citizen in her early 20s.

Four months prior to the series, Jessica began a surreptitious romantic relationship with SWAT Officer Hondo Harrelson (Shemar Moore), which, while frowned upon, was not expressly forbidden by LAPD policy; however, after his promotion to 20-David Team Leader (which put him directly under her command), the two struggled to keep their relationship secret.  Hondo ultimately broke up with her after they were caught by Commissioner Michael Plank (Peter Facinelli) in order to protect her career.

She eventually leaves LAPD to accept the undercover work for the FBI.

As an LAPD captain, Jessica carries a Glock 19 in 9×19mm as her duty weapon.

Jim Street

Officer James "Jim" Street is the newest member of SWAT.  He transferred over from the Long Beach Police Department.  He is portrayed by Alex Russell.

When Street was 12 years old, his mother Karen was arrested by future SWAT Team Leader Buck Spivey for murdering her abusive husband/Street's father, and since live in a foster home alongside his foster brother, Nate Warren, whom he recently reconnects. Early on, Street proves to be a hotshot cop and a lone wolf, taking dangerous risks to get the bad guys, making Hondo question whether or not he's fit for SWAT. He still visits his mother in prison, although his mother does take advantage of him, which leads him into more trouble with Hondo. Ultimately, in the season finale, Street strains his relationship with the team to deal with another crisis involving his mother, which leads to Hondo kicking him off SWAT.

Eventually, after learning his mother resorts into cocaine again, Street is finally done with his mother and moves out from his house. Afterwards, he apologized to Hondo, stating he was right all along. Hondo accepts his apology, and gets him into SWAT Academy. After weeks back at the academy, despite not being chosen back at SWAT, Deacon decides to bring him back for one day before Hicks and Hondo revealed that Street will rejoin SWAT on probationary period for 6 months. He eventually reports his estranged mother for parole violation and narcotics influence and has no choice but to send her back to prison. He was dating Molly Hicks, who happens to be the daughter of his superior, Robert Hicks, until he breaks up with her since he doesn't love Molly as much as she deserves. He and Chris begin a relationship at the end of season five.

His call sign is 26-David.

Chris Alonso

Officer III Christina "Chris" Alonso is the sole female officer in SWAT, and is just as tough as any of the men.  Before joining SWAT, she was a dog handler with the Canine Platoon.  She is portrayed by Lina Esco.

In "Homecoming", Chris reveals to Street that she's bisexual, and later mentions that her large, extended family initially struggled to understand her bisexuality, but now embrace it (with one of her younger relatives teasing her about dating both boys and girls).

In "Crews", Chris is asked by Officer Erika Rogers, a SWAT candidate, to help her prepare for joining the teams; although she declines to help directly – believing that the only woman in SWAT helping the only current female SWAT candidate wouldn't do either of them any good – she does arrange for Street to help her on the course and Luca (who is a member of the SWAT selection board) to ensure Officer Rogers gets a fair shake from the members.

In "Day Off", When her cousin, Tomas, was 12 and was diagnosed with Leukemia, Chris donated her bone marrow to save his life.

In "Patrol", Chris is offered a spot on Sergeant Mumford's team (which would come with a promotion), but she turned him down to remain on Hondo's team.

In "Sea Legs", she reveals her mother died in a car accident when she was 13.

In "Animus", Chris reveals to Lieutenant Piper Lynch that she was kidnapped by a group of men when she was 15, who thought she was someone else, where she was raped. She never reported the incident and didn't tell her family until years later. She decided to become a cop because she was done being afraid. She never told her S.W.A.T. family about the incident. 

Openly bisexual, she enters a polyamorous relationship in the second season, but breaks it off later. Alonso is the godmother to Deacon's children. At the end of the fifth season, after finally starting a relationship with Street, she leaves SWAT and the LAPD altogether to take over the duty of helping and housing illegal immigrant girls seeking asylum in the United States.

Her call sign was 24-David.

Dominique Luca

Officer III+1 Dominique Luca is a third-generation SWAT officer and current third-in-command of Hondo's team; his grandfather was on one of the LAPD's first SWAT Teams in the 1970s.  He is portrayed by Kenny Johnson.

Luca acts as the driver of SWAT's main transport truck, affectionately called 'Black Betty.' Deacon admits that Luca is a gifted mechanic, as he is seen driving various other SWAT-related vehicles. Early in Season one, Luca was kicked out of his apartment by his girlfriend and the team is reluctant to take him in, due to him being a terrible houseguest, despite his friendly and easy-going personality. Street was forced to take him as punishment for earlier actions. In 'Miracle', he mentions that the top of his bucket list is getting a picture with Beyoncé which he achieved after winning a game of 'SWAT-Tag' with Chris.

In "Patrol", Luca reveals that he is dyslexic and wasn't diagnosed as such until he was 14. In "Source", Street is forced to kick Luca out of his apartment to make way for his mother, but because he doesn't like living alone, Chris gives him a retired K-9 drug dog called Duke as a pet.

In "The Tiffany Experience", Luca invites Street to be his roommate again, which he gladly accepted.

His Callsign is 22-David.

Victor Tan

Officer III Victor Tan is a three-year veteran of SWAT, joining after serving with the LAPD Hollywood Division's Vice Squad.  He is portrayed by David Lim.

In "Rocket Fuel", it was revealed that he joined the LAPD because of his deceased cousin who thought was killed in a car accident, but later revealed to be overdosed by the PCP drug.

He was married to his long-time girlfriend, Bonnie Lonsdale but in Season 6 episode "Lion's Share", it was revealed that she was caught cheating on Tan. As a result, their marriage came to an end which also resulted in Tan facing a 2-week suspension from SWAT for getting into a bar fight while drunk. 

His callsign is 25-David.

Jack Mumford

Sergeant II Jeffrey "Jack" Mumford is another SWAT Team Leader whose team frequently works alongside Hondo's.  He is portrayed by Peter Onorati.

He has been divorced three times; in "Payback", he gets engaged again after only a month-long courtship, and they are married soon after.

In "S.O.S.", he is also a SWAT training  instructor alongside Rocker. He retired in "Invisible", leaving command of his team to Sgt. Rocker.

His callsign was 50-David.

David "Deacon" Kay

The senior member of Hondo's team, Sergeant II David "Deacon" Kay has been with SWAT for 10 years.  After Buck was fired, Deacon was passed over for promotion (despite his seniority) in favor of Hondo who was selected in a blatant attempt to ease the tensions between the community and the LAPD.  He is portrayed by Jay Harrington.

Deacon is the only member of the team to be married and have children; he and his wife Annie (portrayed by Bre Blair) celebrated their 10-year anniversary in 2018. In "Seizure", Annie suffers a seizure and is hospitalized in need of emergency surgery. However, in the next episode, Annie collapses again and Cortez reaches out Plank in order to get a specialist to save her life. In the season one finale, Deacon and Annie renew their vows with their friends present with Deacon taking extra time off to take care of the kids so Annie can pursue her original career as a lawyer, however Annie revealed she is pregnant again.

In season 2, Deacon begins to struggle financially, forcing him to take on a second job as a security consultant for a friend of Hondo's. Luca notices his struggles with money and gives him money to help them out. Things reach breaking point after his newborn daughter, Victoria Josie Kay, is diagnosed with a heart condition and he is unable to pay for the operation to fix it. He reaches out to a former loan shark he once busted for a loan to pay for the operation, but due to him crashing into a truck to prevent it from hitting civilians, he is injured and forced to go to rehab in the coming months, making him worry about his situation even more.

In "Cash Flow", Deacon was offered command of Sgt. Mumford's team after Mumford announced his retirement, but Deacon withdrew his name for consideration after he took money from a crime scene for a minute before putting it back.

One of his four children, Lila, is named after a school shooting victim back in 2013. His call sign is 30-David.

Robert Hicks

The LAPD Special Operations Bureau Executive Officer, Commander Robert Hicks is the direct superior and mentor of Captain Jessica Cortez.  In 2017, he fired Sergeant Buck Spivey after he accidentally shot an unarmed black teenager during a shootout and appointed Hondo Harrelson as his replacement over senior team member Sergeant Deacon Kay in a blatant attempt to ease the tensions between the community and the LAPD.  He is portrayed by Patrick St. Esprit.

Cmdr. Hicks is a widower; his wife Barbara passed away due to Alzheimer three years prior to "Seizure".  The two of them were close friends with the Kay family; it was Barbara who taught Deacon's wife Annie how to be a SWAT wife. He and Barbara have two children, Molly, an attorney who lives in Pittsburgh, and John-Paul "J.P", a gay-rights protester and drug user with whom he has been estranged with for most of his life that only got worse after Barbara's death.

As a senior officer with the LAPD, Cmdr. Hicks carries a Kimber Custom TLE II in .45 ACP as his duty weapon.

St. Esprit was promoted to a series regular for season 2.

Piper Lynch
Detective Lieutenant Piper Lynch from LAPD Hollywood Division and is also appointed by the mayor as a tactical consultant to SWAT. Despite being a challenge to the team’s normal strategies in the field and not being a S.W.A.T. officer, she is an experienced detective with impressive contacts all over Los Angeles. She is portrayed by Amy Farrington.

Recurring characters

Overview

Other S.W.A.T. Members

Buck Spivey
Sergeant II William "Buck" Spivey is a former LAPD SWAT Team Leader.  In 2017, his long and distinguished career came to an abrupt end when he was fired for accidentally shooting an unarmed black teenager. In the third season episode "Stigma", he attempts to commit suicide at a lake but his former 20-squad members find him and reach out to him and help by talking him down about how much of an impact he has on all of their lives and how hurt they would be if he went through with it. At the end of the episode, Dr. Wendy reveals that Buck is now getting counseling.    He is portrayed by Louis Ferreira.

Donovan Rocker
Sergeant II Donovan Rocker is a SWAT officer from Mumford's SWAT team, and also a SWAT training instructor.  He is portrayed by Lou Ferrigno Jr.

In "Invisible", Sgt. Rocker took over command of the retiring Sgt. Mumford's team.

Sgt. Stevens 
Sergeant I Stevens is a veteran SWAT member. He is portrayed by real-life San Diego Police S.W.A.T. officer Otis Gallop, who also serves as the shows technical advisor.

Beni
Officer Beni is a S.W.A.T officer who temporarily filled in for Street when Hondo's team was a man down.  He is portrayed by Juan Javier Cardenas.

Erika Rogers
Officer III Erika Rogers is a newly recruited S.W.A.T. officer assigned to Rocker's 50-David squad. She was killed after being involved in a shootout with a suspect. She is portrayed by Lyndie Greenwood.

Wendy Hughes
Dr. Wendy Hughes is a psychologist who usually assists the S.W.A.T unit.  She is portrayed by Cathy Cahlin Ryan. Ryan previously starred on The Shield, also created by her real life husband, Shawn Ryan.

Nora Fowler
Officer Nora Fowler is the newly-created Tactical Emergency Medical Support Officer for S.W.A.T. Hicks assigns her to 20-David as an experiment to minimize wait time for medical personal in the field, however Hondo was against the idea because the team was still reeling from Erika Rogers' death. Formerly an Army Combat Medic in Afghanistan, EMT with LAFD and certified in mountain and deep water rescue, Fowler proved herself as an asset to the team in trying to save the life of a suspect, despite Hondo's orders. However, the two later came to an understanding at the end of the episode. She is portrayed by Norma Kuhling

Lee Durham
Lee Durham is a member of S.W.A.T. that sometimes works with Hondo's team. However, it was revealed later on that he has racist views and was exposed by Deacon alongside two other like-minded cops. He was later fired from the LAPD after Hondo released a statement to the LA Times. He is portrayed by Adam Aalderks.

Rodrigo Sanchez
Rodrigo Sanchez is the new leader of 20-Squad, tasked with making Hondo quit. He later retired from the LAPD to take up a security job. He is portrayed by David DeSantos.

Alexis Cabrera
Officer Alexis Cabrera is a newly recruited member of S.W.A.T. Her first assignment with 20-squad occurred when Chris took time off and when Chris left, she remained with the team. She is portrayed by Brigitte Kali Canales.

Zoe Powell
Zoe Powell is a Police Officer for the Los Angeles Police Department. She first appeared during a S.W.A.T. Academy session. She later passes the selection and became member of S.W.A.T. She reminds Street of himself in the beginning. She is portrayed by Anna Enger Ritch.

Friends and Family of the SWAT team

Daniel Harrelson, Sr.
Daniel Harrelson, Sr. is Hondo's father.  He is portrayed by Obba Babatundé.

Charice Harrelson
Charice Harrelson is Hondo's mother. She is portrayed by Debbie Allen.

Briana Harrelson
Briana Harrelson is Hondo's half-sister. She is portrayed by Gabrielle Dennis.

Winnie Harrelson
Winnie Harrelson is Hondo's older sister. She is portrayed by April Parker Jones.

Darryl Henderson
Darryl Henderson, the son of Hondo's best friend who spent time in juvenile detention. He later lives with Hondo, and in "Invisible", Hondo reveals that he will attempt to become Darryl's legal guardian.  He is portrayed by Deshae Frost.

Leroy Henderson
Leroy Henderson, Hondo's childhood friend and father of Darryl Henderson, who was incarcerated in California State Prison from seasons 1-3. Was released on parole in season 4 He is portrayed by Michael Beach.

Nia Wells
Nia Wells is LA's Deputy District Attorney and Hondo's new love interest introduced in season 2 until they later call off their relationship. Nia briefly returns in season 3 and intends to get back together with Hondo who rejects her. She is portrayed by Nikiva Dionne.

Annie Kay
Annie Kay is Deacon's wife for 10 years and the mother of his three (four as of Season 2) children. She is portrayed by Bre Blair.

Lila Kay
Lila Kay is Deacon's daughter, she is named after a school shooting victim. She is portrayed by Amanda Lowe-Oadell.

Carl Luca
Sergeant I Carl Luca is a veteran of LAPD SWAT and the father of Officer III+1 Dominic Luca and the son of the late Jack Luca, one of the LAPD's first S.W.A.T. officers.  He is portrayed by Michael O'Neill.

Karen Street
Karen Street was Jim Street's estranged mother. She was in prison for killing her abusive husband/Street's father before being released on parole after 18 years of incarceration.

However, in "Saving Face", after Street finds drugs in her purse, he loses all his loyalty to her and permanently severing his ties with her. In "Kangaroo", Street found her using drugs again, thus Street reports to her parole officer, eventually sending her back to prison. She eventually died off-screen due to drug overdose in "Sentinel". She is portrayed by Sherilyn Fenn.

Molly Hicks
Molly Hicks is Robert Hicks' daughter who works as a pro-bono lawyer and also Street's love interest until he breaks up with her. She is portrayed by Laura James.

Nate Warren
Nate Warren is Jim Street's foster brother. Nate is murdered in the episode Good Cop by crime boss Teague Nolan in retaliation for Street arresting Nolan.  He is portrayed by Cory Hardrict.

Nichelle Carmichael
Nichelle Carmichael is Hondo's love interest introduced in season 3. They break up towards the end of the season, when Hondo realizes they are on two different paths in life. They remain friends during the forth season, and he helps out at the community center whenever possible. Towards the end of the fourth season, they restart their relationship after realizing how happy they make each other. She is portrayed by Rochelle Aytes

Terry Luca 
Terry Luca is Dominique Luca's brother. He is portrayed by Ryan Hurst.

Other characters

Michael Plank
Michael Plank is the President of the Los Angeles Board of Police Commissioners who is currently working with Captain Cortez on various initiatives designed to improve relations between the LAPD and the community.  Commissioner Plank also serves on the Los Angeles Board of Education.  He is portrayed by Peter Facinelli.

In "Hoax", Michael steps down from the Police Commission in order to run for Governor of California.

Raymont Harris
Aaron Bledsoe as Raymont Harris, the teenager shot by Buck. Hondo maintains contact with Harris after the incident.

Tony Larmen
Joseph Lee Anderson as Officer Tony Larmen, Street's patrol partner

Mayor Barrett
Bess Armstrong as Mayor Barrett, mayor of Los Angeles.

Strickland
Sean Riggs as Officer Strickland, an officer from Long Beach PD

Guest
 Dominic Hoffman as Ben Mosley, a former LAPD narcotics detective
 Larry Poindexter as Sergeant Boyer. Poindexter previously starred in S.W.A.T. as Captain Fuller.
 David Marciano as Steve Billings. Marciano reprises his role from The Shield, also created by Shawn Ryan.
 Angelica Scarlett Johnson as Kelly Stewart, a dyslexic girl whom Luca took under his wing
 Steve Villegas as Marcos, a street gangster with whom Luca sometimes butts heads
 Lissa Pallo as Detective Ferris
 Miraj Grbić as Melvin
 Karissa Lee Staples as Bonnie, Tan's girlfriend
 Jackson Hurst as Sikora
 Cory Hardrict as Nate Warren, Street's foster brother
 Bailey Chase as Owen Bennett
 Carlo Arrechea as Gio Torres, a Cuban middleweight boxer who's in the States with his pregnant wife, Esther, for what could be the fight of his life.
 Robert Cicchini as Mark
 Nitya Vidyasagar as Sergeant Wilson

References

S.W.A.T. (franchise)
Lists of American crime television series characters
Lists of American drama television series characters